The Herrick Barn, near Gary, South Dakota, is a Bank barn built in 1899 by "Captain" H.H. Herrick.  It was listed on the National Register of Historic Places in 2005.

It was deemed to be "a significant example of a bank barn in South Dakota."  It was built into the side of a hill and has a stone foundation visible on three sides.  It is timber framed and has a gambrel roof.

Satellite imagery from 2018 suggests the barn no longer exists or the coordinates given here are not accurate.

References

Barns in South Dakota
National Register of Historic Places in South Dakota
Buildings and structures completed in 1899
Deuel County, South Dakota